Cresslawn is a suburb of Kempton Park, in Gauteng province, South Africa. The suburb has a primary school named Cresslawn Primary School, that was established in 1980.

References

Suburbs of Kempton Park, Gauteng